Émilie Fer (born 17 February 1983 in Saint-Maurice) is a French slalom canoeist who competed at the international level from 2000 to 2016.

She won a gold medal in the K1 event at the 2012 Summer Olympics in London. She also finished seventh in the K1 event at the 2008 Summer Olympics in Beijing.

Fer won four medals at the ICF Canoe Slalom World Championships with three golds (K1: 2013; K1 team: 2006, 2014) and a bronze (K1 team: 2015). She also six medals at the European Championships (1 gold, 2 silvers and 3 bronzes).

On 1 January 2013, Fer was made a Knight (Chevalier) of the Legion of Honour.

She announced her retirement in 2017.

World Cup individual podiums

References

External links
 
 

1983 births
Living people
People from Saint-Maurice, Val-de-Marne
Sportspeople from Val-de-Marne
Canoeists at the 2008 Summer Olympics
Canoeists at the 2012 Summer Olympics
Chevaliers of the Légion d'honneur
French female canoeists
Olympic canoeists of France
Olympic medalists in canoeing
Olympic gold medalists for France
Medalists at the 2012 Summer Olympics
European champions for France
Medalists at the ICF Canoe Slalom World Championships